The 2022 FIVB Volleyball Men's Challenger Cup was the third edition of the FIVB Volleyball Men's Challenger Cup, an annual men's international volleyball tournament contested by 8 national teams that acts as a qualifier for the FIVB Volleyball Men's Nations League. The tournament was held at Jamsil Students' Gymnasium in Seoul, South Korea between 28 to 31 July 2022.

Cuba won the title, defeating Turkey in the final, and earned the right to participate in 2023 Nations League replacing Australia, the last placed challenger team after the 2022 edition. South Korea defeated Czech Republic in the 3rd place match.

Qualification

Format
The tournament will compete in the knock-out format (quarterfinals, semifinals, and final), with the host country (South Korea) playing its quarterfinal match against the lowest ranked team among the participating teams. The remaining seven teams are placed from 2nd to 8th positions as per the FIVB World Ranking as of 10 July 2022. Rankings are shown in brackets except the host.

Rule changes
 Court switch at the end of the sets to be eliminated due to COVID-19 safety guidelines and for a better television broadcasts.
 Each team is allowed to call only one time-out during each set in the preliminary. The time-out lasts 30 seconds long.
 Only one technical time-out is made when the leading team reaches 12 points.

Squads

Venue

Pool standing procedure
 Number of matches won
 Match points
 Sets ratio
 Points ratio
 Result of the last match between the tied teams

Match won 3–0 or 3–1: 3 match points for the winner, 0 match points for the loser
Match won 3–2: 2 match points for the winner, 1 match point for the loser

Knockout stage
All times are Korea Standard Time (UTC+09:00).

Quarterfinals
|}

Semifinals
|}

3rd place match
|}

Final
|}

Final standing

See also
2022 FIVB Volleyball Men's Nations League
2022 FIVB Volleyball Women's Challenger Cup
2022 FIVB Volleyball Women's Nations League

References

External links

Fédération Internationale de Volleyball – official website
2022 Challenger Cup – official website

FIVB Volleyball Men's Challenger Cup
FIVB
2022 in South Korean sport
International volleyball competitions hosted by South Korea
FIVB Volleyball Men's Challenger Cup
Sports competitions in Seoul